John (sometimes "Jack")  Claus Voss (born Johannes Claus Voss; 1858–1922) was a German-Canadian sailor best known for sailing around the world in a modified dug-out canoe he named Tilikum ("Friend" in Chinook jargon). Initially a carpenter, Voss apprenticed on a ship voyaging around Cape Horn and thereafter lived primarily as a sailor. 
In 1901 Voss began his most noteworthy voyage with his friend Norman Luxton and ending alone in 1904. He chronicled this and other notable voyages in The Venturesome Voyages of Captain Voss.

References

Further reading
MacFarlane, John & Salmon, Lynn J. Around the World in a Dugout Canoe (Harbour Publishing, Madeira Park, BC, 2019)

External links
 
 John Claus Voss (Spanish)

1858 births
1922 deaths
Canadian sailors
Maritime writers
Canadian non-fiction writers